"Captain Swing" was a name that was appended to several threatening letters during the rural Swing Riots of 1830, when labourers rioted over the introduction of new threshing machines and the loss of their livelihoods. The name was made-up and it came to symbolise the anger of the poor labourers in rural England who wanted a return to the pre-machine days when human labour was used.

Labourers' war

William Cobbett was a political activist who supported the working man. He rode around Kent and Sussex and spoke to agricultural workers about their problems. He then used this as source material for his journal the Political Register. He learned that many agricultural labourers were badly paid, or unemployed  and half starved. The financial support for a  laid off agricultural worker was less than that paid to support a criminal in prison.  Cobbett realised that Parishes were trying to avoid having to provide support to the poor with many parishes sending labouring people to the United States to save the costs of supporting them as paupers. Cobbett  had predicted that there would be problems with the agricultural workers and when rural disturbances started in Kent and spread to Sussex during August 1830, Cobbett described it as the "Labourers' war".

The main causes of the disturbances were due to an excess of labour, predominantly by men who had been involved in the Napoleonic wars, returning home. Also by itinerant Irish labourers prepared to work for next to nothing undercutting the local agricultural workers.  This coincided with a fall in  agricultural prices. During the ensuing depression farmers were not able to pay their agricultural workers a sustainable wage. Farmers also stopped the custom of allowing their workers to take left over crops after the corn harvest, that would help them through the winter. This was compounded by the church tithes and the enclosure of common land. 

Added to this farmers began to introduce  threshing machines that displaced workers.  The displaced workers had no means to feed or clothe their families during the winter. A resident of Lewes in Sussex,  Gideon Mantell  the English obstetrician, geologist and palaeontologist noted in his diary of 1830:

Popular protests by farm workers occurred across agricultural areas of southern England. The main targets for protesting crowds were landowners/ landlords, whose threshing machines they destroyed or dismantled, and whom they petitioned for a rise in wages. 

The protests were notable for their discipline, a tradition of popular protest that went back to the eighteenth century.  The act of marching towards an offending farmer's homestead served not only to maintain group discipline, but also to warn the wider community that  they were regimented and determined.
Often they sought to enlist local parish officials and occasionally magistrates to raise levels of poor relief as well. Throughout England, 2,000 protesters were brought to trial in 1830–1831; 252 were sentenced to death (though only 19 were actually hanged), 644 were imprisoned, and 481 were transported to penal colonies in Australia.

Who was Swing?

Threshing machines had been contentious since the Napoleonic wars. Letters had been sent to farmers, in the Reading area, suggesting that they should get rid of their threshing machines as early as 1811, the following two were reproduced in The London Gazette:

On Saturday night, 28 August 1830, in the Elham Valley, Kent a threshing machine was destroyed by rioters. The ringleaders were arrested on the 27 September 1830, nine days after the word 'Swing' was  graffitied on unpainted walls between Canterbury and Dover. Also two threatening letters were sent to local farmers, signed SWING:

The letters threatened violence. The intention was to terrify the farmers. The local paper reported that farmers who received the first two letters, were so terrified that they placed their machines in the open field inviting their destruction. 

Initially the authorities were not clear who was responsible for the wrecking of threshing machines and other farm equipment blaming it on poachers, smugglers or deer-stealers. However it wasn't long before it was realised that it was mainly local village labourers.

The authorities tried to identify who this 'Swing' was and apprehend him, it took a while for them to realise that  Captain Swing was probably an invented name. The  origin of the name is not clear. But the word 'Swing' seems to have a deliberate double meaning. It could represent how the part of  flail known as either a swing or a swingel, which the thrasher brings down in contact with the corn. It can also represent a swinging corpse on the gallows or gibbet. Possibly a more plausible explanation is that after a work party had stopped to sharpen their scythes and were  ready to recommence work the leader would shout out 'Swing!', the leader was usually known as the Captain, hence 'Captain Swing'. The name 'Captain Swing’ became synonymous with the riots and soon symbolized the whole rural resistance.

Examples of threatening "Swing" letters

{{quote|Sir, Your name is down amongst the Black hearts in the Black Book and this is to advise you and the like of you, who are Parson Justasses, to make your wills. Ye have been the Blackguard Enemies of the People on all occasions, Ye have not yet done as ye ought,... Swing|}}

Not all letters were from impoverished farm labourers trying to improve their lot; other people saw the use of the eponymous 'Swing'  purely for private gain.  For example a letter sent  to  a Mrs Chandler of Church Farm, Pursey, Wiltshire, was an obvious attempt at extortion:

 

The sender turned out to be a soldier in the Dragoons.

Cultural references
Swing is portrayed as an actual person in the alternative reality novel The Difference Engine. Captain Swing is a 1989 album by singer-songwriter Michelle Shocked.
A character named "Findthee Swing" is a captain in the Ankh-Morpork "Unmentionables" secret police in Terry Pratchett's novel Night Watch. Captain Swing & The Electrical Pirates Of Cindery Island is a graphic novel by Warren Ellis, featuring a Captain Swing with advanced electrical technology and a flying boat. 
The stage play Captain Swing by Peter Whelan, directed by  Bill Alexander, was produced by the Royal Shakespeare Company in 1979.

See also
General Ludd
Rebecca Riots
Captain Rock
Notes

References

Citations

 
 
 
 
 
 
 
 
 
 
 
 
 
 
 

External links
"Captain Swing recruits a Mansfield vicar" article from 1831 in The Manchester Guardian'' newspaper.

1830 in England
Anonymity pseudonyms
Social history of England
Riots and civil disorder in England